Vindeby, meaning "Town of the Wends" in Danish, may refer to:

Denmark
 Vindeby, Svendborg Municipality, a settlement in Bregninge Parish, on Tåsinge
 Vindeby, a settlement in Lindelse Parish, Langeland Municipality on Langeland
 Vindeby, a settlement in Vindeby Parish, Lolland Municipality on Lolland
 Vindeby Offshore Wind Farm, off the coast of Lolland

Germany 
 Windeby, a municipality in the district of Rendsburg-Eckernförde, in Schleswig-Holstein, Germany